Eduard Muratovich Baychora (born 4 February 1992) is a Russian football player. He plays for Qizilqum Zarafshon.

Biography
Pupil of the reserve school of FC Kuban, first coach Andrey Viktorovich Yudin. In 2011 he was included in the official application of Kuban, played for the club in the tournament of the youth teams of the RFPL. In 2013 he was transferred to the main team. in the main squad of Kuban made his debut on October 31, 2013 in the cup match against the Ryazan "star". In the 2015/16 season, he moved to FC Tosno (St. Petersburg) with which he became the silver medalist of the FNL championship of the 2016/17 season. Member of the Europa League with FC Kuban (Krasnodar) of the 2013/14 season. March 31, 2018 scored a goal in the last minutes for FC Dynamo (Stavropol) against FC Afips (Afipsky)

Club career
He made his debut in the Russian Football National League for FC Tosno on 21 September 2015 in a game against FC Luch-Energiya Vladivostok.

He played one game for the main squad of FC Kuban Krasnodar in the Russian Cup game against FC Zvezda Ryazan on 31 October 2013.

On 31 March 2018, he scored a late equalizer for FC Dynamo Stavropol against FC Afips Afipsky.

References

External links
 Profile by Russian Football National League
 
 
 

1992 births
People from Karachay-Cherkessia
Living people
Russian footballers
Association football goalkeepers
FC Kuban Krasnodar players
FC Tosno players
FC Khimki players
FC Dynamo Stavropol players
FC Inter Cherkessk players
FC Mashuk-KMV Pyatigorsk players
Sportspeople from Karachay-Cherkessia